The River Plym is a river in Devon, England. It runs from Dartmoor in the centre of the county southwest to meet the River Meavy, then south towards Plymouth Sound. The river is popular with canoeists, and the Plym Valley Railway runs alongside a section of the river.

Course
From the upper reaches, which contain antiquities and mining remains, the river flows roughly southwest past clay workings at Shaugh Prior to The Dewerstone, where it meets the River Meavy. The course then changes to run southwards, between Plymouth and Plympton passing through the National Trust owned Plymbridge Woods and under the ancient Plym Bridge. Its upper tidal estuary is known as the Laira and the lower part is called Cattewater, which is navigable and leads towards Plymouth Sound.

Nomenclature
The name Plym is thought to have its origins in Old English and means the "plum tree" (Cornish ploumenn), from a back-formation from the name of Plympton. The port of Plymouth took its name from the river.

History

, a River-class antisubmarine frigate, was named after the river during World War II. It carried out convoy escort duties in the North Atlantic and was later destroyed in the UK's first nuclear explosion.

When it was in operation, the Cann Quarry Canal left the river at Marsh Mills.

The Plym Valley Railway runs alongside the River Plym. It opened in 1856 as a section of the South Devon and Tavistock Railway, which followed the river as far as the tributary with the River Meavy. The line closed to passengers in 1962, and goods services stopped four years later. The new railway is a volunteer-run railway which operates steam and diesel hauled train rides. The first section from Plym Valley from Marsh Mills station opened in 2001, with an extension to Lee Moor Crossing in 2008. In 2013, the line was extended to Plymbridge. The remainder of the line forms part of the Plym Valley Trail, a cycle route from Plymouth to Ilfracombe.

Leisure
The River Plym is popular for canoeing. The upper section in Dartmoor from Cadover Bridge to Shaugh Bridge is considered challenging, and has been described by the British Canoe Union as the hardest section of river to navigate the park. It is often the first river to fill during heavy rain, and one of the first to drop afterwards. Experienced canoeists judge the water level carefully around the weather. This section has a number of pool drops, which are not recommended for novices. Lower sections beyond Shaugh Bridge to Bickleigh Bridge are easier to navigate past the first rapid, provided the river is at a sufficient water level.

In addition the Plym is rich with brown trout, sea trout and salmon. Angling is allowed in both lower and upper areas with much of the water being managed by Plymouth & District Freshwater Angling Association.

See also
Rivers of the United Kingdom

References
Citations

Sources
 

Plym, River
P